Sweet corn (Zea mays convar. saccharata var. rugosa), also called sugar corn and pole corn, is a variety of corn grown for human consumption with a high sugar content. Sweet corn is the result of a naturally occurring recessive mutation in the genes which control conversion of sugar to starch inside the endosperm of the corn kernel. Sweet corn is picked when still in the immature (milk stage) and prepared and eaten as a vegetable, rather than field corn, which is harvested when the kernels are dry and mature (dent stage). Since the process of maturation involves converting sugar to starch, sweet corn stores poorly and must be eaten fresh, canned, or frozen, before the kernels become tough and starchy.

It is one of the six major types of corn, the others being dent corn, flint corn, pod corn, popcorn, and flour corn.

According to the USDA, 100 grams of raw yellow sweet corn contains 3.43 g glucose, 1.94 g fructose, and 0.89 g sucrose.

History
In 1493, Christopher Columbus returned to Europe with corn seeds, although this revelation didn't succeed due to inadequate education of how to produce corn. Sweet corn occurs as a spontaneous mutation in field corn and was grown by several Native American tribes. The cultivation of sweet occurred when the  Iroquois tribe grew the first recorded sweet corn (called 'Papoon') for European settlers in 1779. It soon became a popular food in the southern and central regions of the United States.

Open pollinated cultivars of white sweet corn started to become widely available in the United States in the 19th century.  Two of the most enduring cultivars, still available today, are 'Country Gentleman' (a Shoepeg corn with small kernels in irregular rows) and 'Stowell's Evergreen'.

Sweet corn production in the 20th century was influenced by the following key developments:
hybridization allowed for more uniform maturity, improved quality and disease resistance
In 1933 'Golden Cross Bantam' was released. It is significant for being the first successful single-cross hybrid and the first specifically developed for disease resistance (Stewart's wilt in this case).
identification of the separate gene mutations responsible for sweetness in corn and the ability to breed cultivars based on these characteristics:
su (normal sugary)
se (sugary enhanced, originally called Everlasting Heritage)
sh2 (shrunken-2)

There are currently hundreds of cultivars, with more constantly being developed.

Anatomy

The fruit of the sweet corn plant is the corn kernel, a type of fruit called a caryopsis. The ear is a collection of kernels on the cob. Because corn is a monocot, there is always an even number of rows of kernels. The ear is covered by tightly wrapped leaves called the husk. Silk is the name for the pistillate flowers, which emerge from the husk. The husk and silk are removed by hand, before boiling but not necessarily before roasting, in a process called husking or shucking.

Consumption

In most of Latin America, sweet corn is traditionally eaten with beans.  Although both corn and beans contain all 9 essential amino acids, eating a wide variety of foods in one day that includes grains and beans ensures the right balance of essential amino acids. In Brazil, sweet corn cut off from the cobs is generally eaten with peas (where this combination, given the practicality of steamed canned grains in an urban diet, is a frequent addition to diverse meals such as salads, stews, seasoned white rice, risottos, soups, pasta, and whole sausage hot dogs).

In Malaysia, there exists a variety unique to the region of Cameron highlands named "pearl corn". The kernels are glossy white resembling pearls and can be eaten raw of the cob but often boiled in water and salt.

In the Philippines, boiled sweet corn kernels are served hot with margarine and cheese powder as an inexpensive snack sold by street vendors.

Similarly, sweet corn in Indonesia is traditionally ground or soaked with milk, which makes available the B vitamin niacin in the corn, the absence of which would otherwise lead to pellagra; in Brazil, a combination of ground sweet corn and milk is also the basis of various well-known dishes, such as pamonha and the pudding-like dessert , while sweet corn eaten directly off the cobs tends to be served with butter.

The kernels are boiled or steamed. In Europe and Asia they are often used as a pizza topping or in salads. Corn on the cob is a sweet corn cob that has been boiled, steamed, or grilled whole; the kernels are then eaten directly off the cob or cut off. Creamed corn is sweet corn served in a milk or cream sauce. Sweet corn can also be eaten as baby corn. Corn soup can be made adding water, butter and flour, with salt and pepper for seasoning.

In the United States, sweet corn is eaten as a steamed vegetable, or on the cob, usually served with butter and salt. It can be found in Tex-Mex cooking in chili, tacos, and salads. When corn is mixed with lima beans it is called succotash. Sweet corn is one of the most popular vegetables in the United States. It is most popular in the southern and central regions of the United States. Corn can come in a variety of fashion, Such as, fresh, canned and frozen. Sweet corn ranks among the top ten vegetables in value and per capita consumption. 

If left to dry on the plant, kernels may be taken off the cob and cooked in oil where, unlike popcorn, they expand to about double the original kernel size and are often called corn nuts.

Health benefits 

Cooking sweet corn increases levels of ferulic acid, which has anti-cancer properties.

Cultivars

Open pollinated (non-hybrid) corn has largely been replaced in the commercial market by sweeter, earlier hybrids, which also have the advantage of maintaining their sweet flavor longer. su cultivars are best when cooked within 30 minutes of harvest. Despite their short storage life, many open-pollinated cultivars such as 'Golden Bantam' remain popular for home gardeners and specialty markets or are marketed as heirloom seeds. Although less sweet, they are often described as more tender and flavorful than hybrids.

Genetics

Early cultivars, including those used by Native Americans, were the result of the mutant su ("sugary") or su1 allele of an isoamylase. They contain about 5–10% sugar by weight. These varieties are juicy due to the phytoglycogen content, but they lose sugar quickly after harvest, with the content halving in 24 hours.

Supersweet corn are cultivars of sweet corn which produce higher than normal levels of sugar developed by University of Illinois at Urbana–Champaign professor John Laughnan. He was investigating two specific genes in sweet corn, one of which, the sh2 mutation (a Glucose-1-phosphate adenylyltransferase), caused the corn to shrivel when dry.  After further investigation, Laughnan discovered that the endosperm of sh2 sweet corn kernels store less starch and from 4 to 10 times more sugar than normal su sweet corn.  He published his findings in 1953, disclosing the advantages of growing supersweet sweet corn, but many corn breeders lacked enthusiasm for the new supersweet corn due to the seed shiveling reducing germination rate.

Illinois Foundation Seeds Inc. was the first seed company to release a supersweet corn and it was called 'Illini Xtra Sweet', but widespread use of supersweet hybrids did not occur until the early 1980s. The popularity of supersweet corn rose due to its long shelf life and large sugar content when compared to conventional sweet corn.  This has allowed the long-distance shipping of sweet corn and has enabled manufacturers to can sweet corn without adding extra sugar or salt. Breeding has resolved the germination rate issue, but it is still generally true that sh2 corn is less juicy than their su counterparts. sh2-i ("shivel2-intermediate") cultivars under development exploits a different mutation on the same gene to try and create varieties that are both juicy and sweet.

The third gene mutation to be discovered is the se (or se1) for "sugary enhanced" allele, responsible for so-called "Everlasting Heritage" cultivars, such as 'Kandy Korn'.  Cultivars with the se alleles have a longer storage life and contain 12–20% sugar. The gene for Se1 has been located.

All of the alleles responsible for sweet corn are recessive, so it must be isolated from other corn, such as field corn and popcorn, that release pollen at the same time; the endosperm develops from genes from both parents, and heterozygous kernels will be tough and starchy. The se and su alleles do not need to be isolated from each other. However supersweet cultivars containing the sh2 allele must be grown in isolation from other cultivars to avoid cross-pollination and resulting starchiness, either in space (various sources quote minimum quarantine distances from 100 to 400 feet or 30 to 120 m) or in time (i.e., the supersweet corn does not pollinate at the same time as other corn in nearby fields).

Modern breeding methods have also introduced cultivars incorporating multiple gene types:
sy (for synergistic) adds the sh2 gene to some kernels (usually 25%) on the same cob as a se base (either homozygous or heterozygous)
augmented sh2 adds the se and su gene to a sh2 parent
Often seed producers of the sy and augmented sh2 types will use brand names or trademarks to distinguish these cultivars instead of mentioning the genetics behind them.  Generally these brands or trademarks will offer a choice of white, bi-color and yellow cultivars which otherwise have very similar characteristics.

Genetically modified corn
Genetically modified sweet corn is available to commercial growers to resist certain insects or herbicides, or both.  Such transgenic varieties are not available to home or small acreage growers due to protocols that must be followed in their production.

See also 
 Frozen vegetables

References

Maize varieties
Vegetables
Crops originating from indigenous Americans
Crops originating from North America
Crops originating from the United States
Grasses of Mexico
Grasses of North America
Grasses of the United States
Agriculture in Mesoamerica
Cuisine of the Northeastern United States
Symbols of Illinois